This is a list of all the opinions written by John C. Major during his tenure as puisne justice of the Supreme Court of Canada.

1992-1998
 This part of the list is incomplete.
 R. v. S. (R.D.), [1997] 3 S.C.R. 484

1999
 Ryan v. Victoria (City), [1999] 1 S.C.R. 201
 R. v. Ewanchuk, [1999] 1 S.C.R. 330
 Smith v. Jones, [1999] 1 S.C.R. 455
 CanadianOxy Chemicals Ltd. v. Canada (Attorney General), [1999] 1 S.C.R. 743
 Novak v. Bond, [1999] 1 S.C.R. 808
 M. v. H., [1999] 2 S.C.R. 3
 Dobson (Litigation Guardian of) v. Dobson, [1999] 2 S.C.R. 753
 Best v. Best, [1999] 2 S.C.R. 868
 Wells v. Newfoundland, [1999] 3 S.C.R. 199
 R. v. Liew, [1999] 3 S.C.R. 227
 Des Champs v. Conseil des écoles séparées catholiques de langue française de Prescott-Russell, [1999] 3 S.C.R. 281
 Abouchar v. Ottawa-Carleton French-language School BoardPublic Sector, [1999] 3 S.C.R. 343

2000
 Arsenault-Cameron v. Prince Edward Island, [2000] 1 S.C.R. 3; 2000 SCC 1
 R. v. Brooks, [2000] 1 S.C.R. 237; 2000 SCC 11
 Nanaimo (City) v. Rascal Trucking Ltd., [2000] 1 S.C.R. 342; 2000 SCC 13
 R. v. G.D.B., [2000] 1 S.C.R. 520; 2000 SCC 22
 Will-Kare Paving & Contracting Ltd. v. Canada, [2000] 1 S.C.R. 915; 2000 SCC 36
 R. v. D.D., [2000] 2 S.C.R. 275; 2000 SCC 43
 Public School Boards' Assn. of Alberta v. Alberta (Attorney General), [2000] 2 S.C.R. 409; 2000 SCC 45
 R. v. Avetysan, [2000] 2 S.C.R. 745; 2000 SCC 56
 Martel building Ltd. v. Canada, [2000] 2 S.C.R. 860; 2000 SCC 60

2001
 R. v. Ferguson, [2001] 1 S.C.R. 281; 2001 SCC 6
 R. v. McClure, [2001] 1 S.C.R. 445; 2001 SCC 14
 Walker Estate v. York Finch General Hospital, [2001] 1 S.C.R. 647; 2001 SCC 23
 R. v. Rideout, [2001] 1 S.C.R. 755; 2001 SCC 27
 R. v. Pakoo, [2001] 1 S.C.R. 757; 2001 SCC 28
 Canada (Deputy Minister of National Revenue) v. Mattel Canada Inc., [2001] 2 S.C.R. 100; 2001 SCC 36
 Boston v. Boston, [2001] 2 S.C.R. 413; 2001 SCC 43
 671122 Ontario Ltd. v. Sagaz Industries Canada Inc., [2001] 2 S.C.R. 983; 2001 SCC 59
 Singleton v. Canada, [2001] 2 S.C.R. 1046; 2001 SCC 61
 Derksen v. 539938 Ontario Ltd., [2001] 3 S.C.R. 398; 2001 SCC 72
 R. v. Jabarianha, [2001] 3 S.C.R. 430; 2001 SCC 75
 Cooper v. Hobart, [2001] 3 S.C.R. 537; 2001 SCC 79
 Edwards v. Law Society of Upper Canada, [2001] 3 S.C.R. 562; 2001 SCC 80
 R. v. Hynes, [2001] 3 S.C.R. 623; 2001 SCC 82
 Dunmore v. Ontario (Attorney General), [2001] 3 S.C.R. 1016; 2001 SCC 94

2002
 Bank of Montreal v. Dynex Petroleum Ltd., [2002] 1 S.C.R. 146; 2002 SCC 7
 Oldfield v. Transamerica Life Insurance Co. of Canada, [2002] 1 S.C.R. 742; 2002 SCC 22
 R. v. Brown, [2002] 2 S.C.R. 185; 2002 SCC 32
 Housen v. Nikolaisen, [2002] 2 S.C.R. 235; 2002 SCC 33
 Gronnerud (Litigation Guardians of) v. Gronnerud Estate, [2002] 2 S.C.R. 417; 2002 SCC 38
 Bank of America Canada v. Mutual Trust Co., [2002] 2 S.C.R. 601; 2002 SCC 43
 R. v. Burke, [2002] 2 S.C.R. 857; 2002 SCC 55
 Krieger v. Law Society of Alberta, [2002] 3 S.C.R. 372; 2002 SCC 65
 R. v. Wilson, [2002] 3 S.C.R. 629; 2002 SCC 69
 R. v. Jarvis, [2002] 3 S.C.R. 757; 2002 SCC 73
 R. v. Ling, [2002] 3 S.C.R. 814; 2002 SCC 74
 373409 Alberta Ltd. (Receiver of) v. Bank of Montreal, [2002] 4 S.C.R. 312; 2002 SCC 81

2003
 Siemens v. Manitoba (Attorney General), [2003] 1 S.C.R. 6; 2003 SCC 3
 R. v. Harriott, [2003] 1 S.C.R. 39; 2003 SCC
 Markevich v. Canada, [2003] 1 S.C.R. 94; 2003 SCC 9
 Starson v. Swayze, [2003] 1 S.C.R. 722; 2003 SCC 32
 Ell v. Alberta, [2003] 1 S.C.R. 857; 2003 SCC 35
 Authorson v. Canada (Attorney General), [2003] 2 S.C.R. 40; 2003 SCC 39
 ParrySound (District) Social Services Administration Board v. O.P.S.E.U., Local 324, [2003] 2 S.C.R. 157; 2003 SCC 42
 Wewaykum Indian Band v. Canada, [2003] 2 S.C.R. 259; 2003 SCC 45
 British Columbia (Minister of Forests) v. Okanagan Indian Band, [2003] 3 S.C.R. 371; 2003 SCC 71
 Beals v. Saldanha, [2003] 3 S.C.R. 416; 2003 SCC 72

2004
 Crystalline Investments Ltd. v. Domgroup Ltd., [2004] 1 S.C.R. 60; 2004 SCC 3
 R. v. Lyttle, [2004] 1 S.C.R. 193; 2004 SCC 5
 Gifford v. Canada, [2004] 1 S.C.R. 411; 2004 SCC 15
 Voice Construction Ltd. v. Construction & General Workers' Union, Local 92, [2004] 1 S.C.R. 609; 2004 SCC 23
 Pritchard v. Ontario (Human Right Commission), [2004] 1 S.C.R. 809; 2004 SCC 31
 Harper v. Canada (Attorney General), [2004] 1 S.C.R. 827; 2004 SCC 33
 Congrégation des témoins de Jéhovah de St-Jérôme-Lafontaine v. Lafontaine (Village), [2004] 2 S.C.R. 650; 2004 SCC 48
 Anderson v. Amoco Canada Oil and Gas, [2004] 3 S.C.R. 3; 2004 SCC 49
 Nova Scotia Power Inc. v. Canada, [2004] 3 S.C.R. 53; 2004 SCC 51
 R. v. Perrier, [2004] 3 S.C.R. 228; 2004 SCC 56
 R. v. Chan, [2004] 3 S.C.R. 245; 2004 SCC 57
 Peoples Department Stores Inc. (Trustee of) v. Wise, [2004] 3 S.C.R. 461; 2004 SCC 68
 R. v. Sazant, [2004] 3 S.C.R. 635; 2004 SCC 77

2005
R. v. Roberts [2005] 1 S.C.R. 22; 2005 SCC 3 
Rothmans, Benson & Hedges Inc. v. Saskatchewan [2005] 1 S.C.R. 188; 2005 SCC 13 
 Gladstone v. Canada (Attorney General) [2005] 1 S.C.R. 325; 2005 SCC 21 
R. v. Paice [2005] 1 S.C.R. 339; 2005 SCC 22 
Chaoulli v. Quebec (Attorney General) [2005] 1 S.C.R. 791; 2005 SCC 35 
 Mugesera v. Canada (Minister of Citizenship and Immigration), [2005] 2 S.C.R. 100; 2005 SCC 40
 Imperial Tobacco v. British Columbia, (2005)
 Canada Trustco Mortgage Co. v. Canada, [2005] 2 S.C.R. 601; 2005 SCC 54(With McLachlin)
 Mathew v. Canada, [2005] 2 S.C.R. 643; 2005 SCC 55 (With McLachlin)
 Zenner v. Prince Edward Island College of Optometrists, [2005] 3 S.C.R. 645; 2005 SCC 77
 Castillo v. Castillo, [2005] 3 S.C.R. 870; 2005 SCC 83

Major